The 103rd Squadron was a squadron of the 2nd Air Wing of the Japan Air Self-Defense Force (JASDF) based at Chitose Air Base in Hokkaido Prefecture, Japan. It was equipped with North American F-86D Sabre aircraft.

History

On March 1, 1960 the squadron was formed at Komaki Air Base as part of the 3rd Air Wing. It moved to Chitose Air Base in 1961 and did Quick Reaction Alert duty for two years, until December 1963. The following year the 203rd Squadron was formed flying the Lockheed F-104 Starfighter.

It was disbanded on October 1, 1968, the same day as the 101st Squadron. At that time, the 101st through 105th Squadrons used F-86D fighters.

Aircraft operated

Fighter aircraft
 North American F-86D Sabre（1960-1968）

See also
 Fighter units of the Japan Air Self-Defense Force

References

Units of the Japan Air Self-Defense Force